Martin Harden (25 February 1876 – 18 July 1968) was a fencer. He competed for Austria at the 1906 Summer Olympics and for Czechoslovakia at the 1928 Summer Olympics.

References

External links
 

1876 births
1968 deaths
Austrian male foil fencers
Czech male foil fencers
Czechoslovak male épée fencers
Olympic fencers of Austria
Olympic fencers of Czechoslovakia
Fencers at the 1906 Intercalated Games
Fencers at the 1928 Summer Olympics
Austrian male épée fencers
Czechoslovak male foil fencers
Czech male épée fencers
Sportspeople from the Austro-Hungarian Empire